Hans Aasnæs,  (15 December 1902 – 4 July 1965) was a Norwegian army officer, Olympic sport shooter and World Champion. A lawyer by education, Aasnæs was a member of the Norwegian Army during the Second World War, fighting against Nazi Germany.  After the war, he participated in numerous national and international shooting championships, including five Olympic Games, and won several World Championship medals.

Personal life
Aasnæs was born in the municipality of Sande in Vestfold, the son of farmers Hans Alfred Aasnæs and Anna Kristine Freberg. On 2 May 1928, he married Kristiania-born Eleanor Chambers Poulsson, with whom he had one child before she died in 1933. In 1936 he married Astrid With, with whom he had two children. Through her, Hans Aasnæs was a brother-in-law of wartime resistance member and engineer Bror With. He was also a cousin of fellow Olympic sport shooter Håkon Aasnæs. Hans Aasnæs died in Oslo in 1965.

Career

Early civilian and military career
Aasnæs graduated from the upper section of the Norwegian Military Academy in 1923, joining the 1st Division with the rank of first lieutenant. He served with the 14th Infantry Regiment, before transferring to the 1st Infantry Regiment in 1924. Having taken a course as an aviation scout at Kjeller Airport in 1925, he was transferred to the reserves in 1930.

In civilian life, Aasnæs achieved his examen artium academic certification in 1920, and graduated with a cand.jur. law degree in 1925, which qualified him for work in the superior courts in 1927. After further studies in England, France and Denmark from 1926 to 1927, he was employed as an office manager at the cooperative insurance agency "Felleskontoret for Brandforsikring".

1930s
At the Norwegian national shooting championships, between 1934 and 1960, Aasnæs won a total of 29 gold medals in seven different shooting disciplines. He was also awarded the King's Cup six different years, the first time in 1934. He competed at the 1936 Summer Olympics in Berlin, where he placed ninth in 25 metre rapid fire pistol event. At the 1937 World Championships he won a silver medal in the running deer double shot event, and a bronze medal in the running deer single shot event. Aasnæs was a member of the Norwegian Officers' Pistol Club, the Oslo Sport Shooters and the Hunting Shooter Club.

Second World War
Aasnæs was an army officer by profession. Following the German invasion of Norway on 9 April 1940, he fought in the Norwegian Campaign at Valdres. At the time of the campaign he held the rank of captain. Aasnæs arrived in Valdres on 25 April 1940, and assumed command of Company 7, 2nd Battalion of the 10th Infantry Regiment. The day prior to Aasnæs' arrival, the company had been thrown back from their positions in heavy fighting with advancing German units, losing their commander. After leading the company in heavy fighting for several days, the battalion commander, Major Leonard Sæter, was wounded, and Aasnæs was promoted to command the entire 2nd Battalion on 30 April. As the Norwegian forces' situation became more desperate, Aasnæs and fellow battalion commander, Captain Olav B. Skaathun, agreed to merge the remains of their units in the Vestre Slidre area, in an attempt to continue resistance against the German advance. However, the commander of the Norwegian forces in Valdres, Colonel Gudbrand Østbye, realized his forces were in an unwinnable position, and ordered their capitulation on 1 May 1940. On 3 May 1940, the officers were sent by buses to Oslo, while the non-commissioned officers and men were sent by train to a prisoner-of-war camp at Hvalsmoen. The Norwegian prisoners of war from the Valdres front were released from captivity in groups during May and June 1940, the last officers being released in mid-June.

In 1941 Aasnæs made his way to the United Kingdom and joined the exiled Norwegian forces there, initially assuming command of a company of the Norwegian Brigade in Scotland. In 1942 he was promoted to the rank of major. One of his former soldiers would later describe Aasnæs as "... a strict but good company commander." From February to August 1944 he served as chief of staff of the Norwegian Brigade in Scotland.

During his time in exile, Aasnæs was involved in several conflicts with other exiled Norwegians. In addition to repeatedly criticising the Norwegian government in exile, he was one of a very few officers to criticise the exiled army's first commander, General Carl Gustav Fleischer, whom Aasnæs described as "... tired and worn by all the difficulties in the first time in England ...," and "... at the moment not fully able to build a Norwegian army in the United Kingdom ...." In the last months of the war, Aasnæs was angered by the Norwegian authorities decision to retain the Norwegian Brigade in Scotland, rather than deploy it to the front during the final battles against Germany. The Minister of Foreign Affairs during much of the period in exile, Trygve Lie, later described Aasnæs as "... a right-minded, somewhat conservative man ...." Lie also stated that Aasnæs was "honest", and "... a true patriot who saw it as his obligation to speak out."

Post war
Having left the army that year, Aasnæs became the World Champion in the individual 100 metre running deer double shot event in 1947. He was also part of the Norwegian team that won a silver medal in the running deer double shot event, and bronze medal in the running deer single shot event. At the 1949 World Championships, he won a gold medal with the Norwegian team in the running deer combined event. In 1952, he won two team gold medals at the World Championships, in the running deer single shot and double shot events. At the 1954 World Championships he won a bronze medal in Olympic trap.

He competed in five Olympic Games, with a 5th place in trap at the 1960 Summer Olympics in Rome as best result.

Honours and awards
In addition to his numerous shooting awards and medals, Aasnæs was awarded the Norwegian Haakon VII 70th Anniversary Medal, and was made an Officer of the Order of the British Empire for his wartime service.

References

External links

1902 births
1965 deaths
People from Sande, Vestfold
Norwegian Military Academy alumni
20th-century Norwegian lawyers
Norwegian expatriates in England
Norwegian expatriates in France
Norwegian expatriates in Denmark
Norwegian male sport shooters
ISSF rifle shooters
Olympic shooters of Norway
Shooters at the 1936 Summer Olympics
Shooters at the 1948 Summer Olympics
Shooters at the 1952 Summer Olympics
Shooters at the 1956 Summer Olympics
Shooters at the 1960 Summer Olympics
Norwegian Army personnel of World War II
Norwegian prisoners of war in World War II
World War II prisoners of war held by Germany
Officers of the Order of the British Empire
Sportspeople from Vestfold og Telemark